Khoshaba Lawo,  1 July 1939 – 16 July 2000) was a former Iraqi midfielder who played for Iraq. He played from Iraq from 1957 to 1964.

He retired in 1965 and died on 16 July 2000.

References

1939 births
2000 deaths
Iraqi footballers
Iraq international footballers
Association football midfielders